The 1950 Victorian Football Association season was the 69th season of the Australian rules football competition. The premiership was won by the Oakleigh Football Club, which defeated Port Melbourne by 19 points in the Grand Final on 30 September. It was the third premiership won by the club.

Australian National Football Council affiliation 
During the 1949 season, the Association had made the decision to re-affiliate with the Australian National Football Council. This meant that from 1950, the Association played under the national standard code of rules. Most notably, this meant that throwing the ball in general play was no longer legal. Other rules, including the free kick for 'kicking in danger' which had been introduced under Association rules in 1947, also had to be dropped.

Premiership 
The home-and-home season was played over nineteen matches, before the top four clubs contested a finals series under the Page–McIntyre system to determine the premiers for the season.

Ladder

Finals

Awards 
 The leading goalkicker for the home-and-home season was Bruce Harper (Sandringham), who kicked 70 goals; the leading goalkicker overall was Johnny Walker (Williamstown), who kicked 66 goals in the home-and-home season and 71 goals overall.
 The J. J. Liston Trophy was won by Frank Stubbs (Camberwell), who polled 38 votes. Jack Spencer (Brunswick) was second with 28 votes, and Roy Harper (Sandringham) was third with 26½ votes.
 Coburg won the seconds premiership. Coburg 8.11 (59) defeated Williamstown 7.11 (53) in the Grand Final, played as a curtain raiser to the firsts Grand Final on 30 September.

Notable events

Brisbane Carnival 
As a consequence of joining the ANFC, the Association was permitted to send a representative team to the 1950 Brisbane Carnival. The team was coached by Bill Faul (Prahran) and captained by Jack Whelan (Brunswick). The Association competed in the top division, and finished in last place with a record of 1–3; this meant that the Association was required to play off against the winner of the lower division, the Australian Amateurs, during 1951 to determine which team qualified for the top division at the next carnival.

Other notable events 
 The match between Brunswick and Camberwell on 19 August ended in controversy. The final bell was rung with Camberwell leading by a point, and Camberwell fans ran onto the ground to celebrate; but, umpire Irvine had not heard the bell and allowed play to continue; fifteen seconds later, Brunswick's Ivor McIvor scored a goal, and Brunswick 10.14 (74) defeated Camberwell 9.15 (69). Camberwell protested the result, and the Association declared the match 'no result'. No replay was held, as it was late in the season and the match could not affect the final four; as such, both teams are credited with eighteen games instead of nineteen for the year.

External links 
 List of VFA/VFL Premiers

References 

Victorian Football League seasons
VFL